Mata de Plátano is a barrio in the municipality of Luquillo, Puerto Rico. Its population in 2010 was 8,972.

Gallery

See also

 List of communities in Puerto Rico

References

Barrios of Luquillo, Puerto Rico